Saura is a religion and denomination of Hinduism, originating as a Vedic tradition. Followers of Saura worship Surya as the Saguna Brahman. At present the Sauras are a very small movement, much smaller than other larger denominations such as Vaishnavism or Shaivism. There was a rapid decline of the Sauras in the 12th and 13th century CE, due to the Muslim conquests.

History
The sun has been worshipped in various forms since the time of the Rig Veda in India. The prominence of the Saura sect is expounded by the supremacy of the Gayatri mantra in the Vedic prayers. The theology of the sect appears in a number of documents like the Mahabharata, Ramayana, Markandeya Purana and a fifth century inscription.

In the Mahabharata
On one occasion, when leaving his chambers in the morning, Yudhisthira encounters one thousand Saurite brahmins with eight thousand followers.

Surya worship
The priests of the saura sect were called magas, bhojakas, or sakadivipiya brahmins. In the Saura sect, the god Surya is the lord of the Trimurti, the eternal Brahman and the supreme spirit, the soul of all creatures, self existent, unborn, the cause of all things and the foundation of the world. Saura followers worship Surya as the Saguna Brahman.

Texts
The most important text of the Saura sect is the Saura Samhita. Its only extant copy is currently in Nepal and has been dated to 941 A.D. but is considered to be older. Another text of importance is the Surya Satakam, a Sanskrit poem of a hundred stanzas. The poem was composed in the sragdhara meter and written in the gaudi style by Mayurbhatta, a poet in the court of Harshavardhana and a rival of Banabhatta. Surya as the bestower of moksha (release) is emphasized in this text. The Samba Purana, a Saurite upapurana, is a text entirely dedicated to Surya.

References

Hindu denominations